Cristian Humberto Milla (born 9 June 1984) is an Argentine footballer that currently plays for Club Atlético Fénix as striker.

Club career
Milla began his career in the youth system of Chacarita Juniors. After a loan spell with Almagro he joined Universidad de Chile in July 2008.

In 2009 Chacarita Juniors were promoted to the Primera División and Milla was loaned back to the club by Universidad de Chile. In 2010, he returned to Universidad de Chile, and later in August he was released from the Chilean team after reaching an agreement with the club.

Honours

Club
Primera División de Chile (1): 2009 Apertura

External links
 Cristian Milla at Football-Lineups
 
 

1984 births
Living people
Footballers from Buenos Aires
Argentine footballers
Chacarita Juniors footballers
Club Almagro players
Universidad de Chile footballers
Defensa y Justicia footballers
Rangers de Talca footballers
Cobreloa footballers
Centro Atlético Fénix players
C.D. Huachipato footballers
Arsenal de Sarandí footballers
Flandria footballers
Primera B de Chile players
Chilean Primera División players
Argentine Primera División players
Primera Nacional players
Argentine expatriate footballers
Expatriate footballers in Chile
Association football forwards